O Street is a short story collection by Corrina Wycoff.

O Street may also refer to:
O Street Market, Shaw neighborhood, Washington, D.C.
O Street Museum Foundation, museum in Washington, D.C.
The Mansion on O Street, hotel in Washington, D.C.
O Street, of O Street Viaduct (Omaha, Nebraska)